Wallace Markfield (August 12, 1926 – May 24, 2002) was an American comic novelist best known for his first novel, To an Early Grave (1964), about four men who spend the day driving across Brooklyn to their friend's funeral. He is also known for Teitlebaum's Window (1970), a comic novel about a Jewish boy growing up in Brooklyn in the 1930s and 1940s. Markfield was awarded a Guggenheim Fellowship in 1965 after the publication of To an Early Grave.

Life 
Markfield was born in Brooklyn, New York, and graduated from Abraham Lincoln High School, earning a B.A. from Brooklyn College in 1947, then doing his graduate work at New York University between 1948–1950. While giving a lecture on "Stéphane Mallarmé and Alienation" at the City College of New York, Markfield was interrupted by potato salad splattering suddenly onto his face. The disruptive potato salad, thrown by Carl Solomon and two of Solomon's friends, including future National LGBTQ Task Force co-founder Ron Gold, was an effective demonstration of the principles of Dadaism, one of the subjects Markfield was discussing in his lecture. Many in the audience did not appreciate the irony. The potato salad incident would later be immortalized in Allen Ginsberg's famous poem, Howl. In 1948 Markfield married Anna May Goodman; the couple had a daughter named Andrea. He later taught creative writing at San Francisco State College (1966–68), Kirkland College (1968–69), and Queens College (1971–73). At the time of his death he had been working on a novel for eleven years. Markfield died of a heart attack in Roslyn, New York, on May 24, 2002.

Work
In addition to To an Early Grave and Teitelbaum's Window Markfield also wrote You Could Live If They Let You (1974), Multiple Orgasms (1977) and Radical Surgery (1991). The 1991 thriller was already conceived by the end of the 1970s. Throughout his writing career, Markfield also contributed at least 40 articles to periodicals. Dalkey Archive Press reissued Teitlebaum's Window in October 1999 and To an Early Grave in December 2000.

Multiple Orgasms
In an interview conducted in the spring of 1978 at Markfield's home in Port Washington, New York he said: "[Multiple Orgasms] was a first person narrative, completely through the eyes of a woman. I found it awfully tiresome after a while, though I never find women tiresome. But she became just a great bore to me. After about a hundred and seventy-five pages or so, I just gave up. It was getting nowhere." It was published only as a limited edition of about three hundred copies, individually numbered and signed by the author.

Release details
 1964 To an Early Grave
 1970 Teitelbaum's Window
 1974 You Could Live If They Let You
 1977 Multiple Orgasms
 1991 Radical Surgery

Cinema 
In 1968 To an Early Grave was adapted for the screen under the title Bye Bye Braverman, directed by Sidney Lumet and starring George Segal and Jack Warden.

Sources

The Wallace Markfield Papers

External links
 Wallace Markfield papers at the University of South Carolina Irvin Department of Rare Books and Special Collections.

1926 births
2002 deaths
20th-century American novelists
American male novelists
Jewish American novelists
People from Port Washington, New York
20th-century American male writers
Abraham Lincoln High School (Brooklyn) alumni
Brooklyn College alumni
New York University alumni
20th-century American Jews
21st-century American Jews